Kippara is a civil parish of Macquarie County, New South Wales, Australia, and a bounded rural locality of Mid-North Coast Council on the Mid North Coast.

The civil parish is predominantly in Willi Willi National Park.

References

Forests of New South Wales
Mid North Coast